Elizabeth "Lizzie" Bird (born 4 October 1994) is a British athlete who specializes in the 3000 metres steeplechase. She won the silver medal at the 2022 Commonwealth Games and a bronze at the 2022 European Athletics Championships.

Bird is the current British record-holder in the 3000 m steeplechase with a time of 9:07.87. She is a two-time British national champion.

Early career
Elizabeth Bird began running in St Albans, and her first club was Hertfordshire Phoenix Athletic Club. She studied at the Princeton University graduating in Public and International Affairs in 2017. She was an NCAA Honorable Mention All-America honoree in the steeplechase in 2015 and was a four-time NCAA Regional qualifier. Bird was a two-time Ivy League champion in the steeplechase and part of the 4x800 m team that won a conference title in 2017 as well as being the Ivy League Cross Country Champion in 2015.

Career
Bird competed in the women's 3000 m steeplechase event at the 2019 World Athletics Championships and did not advance from the heats clocking a personal best of 9:30.13.

Having qualified for the delayed 2020 Tokyo Olympics in her specialist event, she reached the final after finishing fifth in her heat. In the final Bird broke the national record with a time of 9:19.68, placing ninth.

In July 2022, she did not qualify for the final at the World Athletics Championships held in Eugene, Oregon in a time of 9:23.17. At about three weeks later, Bird won the silver medal at the Commonwealth Games Birmingham 2022 in a personal best of 9:17.79. She set new lifetime best and a British record of 9:07.87 at the Monaco Diamond League five days later. Also in August, she earned a bronze at the European Athletics Championships in Munich, clocking 9:23.18.

Personal life
Bird studied also for a master's degree in International Studies at the University of San Francisco between 2017 and 2018 but deferred a place at law school in Boulder, Colorado in order to focus on the 2020 Summer Olympics. She has been involved in advocacy and support for human rights organisation Detention Action.

References

External links
 
 

1994 births
Living people
British female middle-distance runners
British female steeplechase runners
Olympic athletes of Great Britain
Athletes (track and field) at the 2020 Summer Olympics
World Athletics Championships athletes for Great Britain
British Athletics Championships winners
Place of birth missing (living people)
European Athletics Championships medalists
People educated at St Albans School, Hertfordshire
Commonwealth Games silver medallists for England
Commonwealth Games medallists in athletics
Athletes (track and field) at the 2022 Commonwealth Games
Medallists at the 2022 Commonwealth Games